The 1984 African Cup of Nations was the 14th edition of the Africa Cup of Nations, the football championship of Africa (CAF). It was hosted by Ivory Coast. Just like in 1982, the field of eight teams was split into two groups of four. Cameroon won its first championship, beating Nigeria in the final 3−1.

Qualified teams 

The 8 qualified teams are:

  (4th participation in CAN)
  (4th participation in CAN)
  (6th participation in CAN) (host)
  (9th participation in CAN)
  (8th participation in CAN) (holders)
  (1st participation in CAN)
  (6th participation in CAN)
  (2nd participation in CAN)

Squads

Venues 
The competition was played in two venues in Abidjan and Bouaké.

Group stage

Group A

Group B

Knockout stage

Semifinals

Third place match

Final

Scorers 
4 goals

  Taher Abouzeid

3 goals

  Théophile Abéga

2 goals

  Lakhdar Belloumi
  Bonaventure Djonkep
  Clement Temile

1 goal

  Tedj Bensaoula
  Nasser Bouiche
  Ali Fergani
  Rabah Madjer
  Djamel Menad
  Hocine Yahi
  Ibrahim Aoudou
  Ernest Ebongué
  René Ndjeya
  Roger Milla
  Magdi Abdelghani
  Emad Soliman
  Seth Ampadu
  Opoku Nti
  Youssouf Fofana
  Michel Goba
  Tia Koffi
  Pascal Miezan
  Clifton Msiya
  Harry Waya
  Ali Bala
  Chibuzor Ehilegbu
  Stephen Keshi
  Muda Lawal
  Henry Nwosu
  Rafiou Moutairou

Final standing

CAF Team of the Tournament

External links 

 Details at RSSSF

 
Nations
International association football competitions hosted by Ivory Coast
African Cup Of Nations, 1984
Africa Cup of Nations tournaments
March 1984 sports events in Africa